Du bist nicht allein is a 2007 German comedy film directed by Bernd Böhlich.

Cast

External links 

2007 comedy films
2007 films
German comedy films
2000s German-language films
2000s German films